Nikko Hurtado (born 1981) is an American tattoo artist who specializes in colored portraiture.

History
Hurtado was born in the San Fernando Valley, California in 1981 and began tattooing in 2002, eventually opening his own tattoo shop in 2010, Black Anchor Collective in Hesperia, California.  He opened his new location Black Anchor in Los Angeles, California on Melrose Ave in 2017. He has been featured on LA Ink and Ink Master, as well as several instructional DVDs. In 2012 Hurtado participated as a jury member for the Chaudesaigues Award, an award that recognizes the career and the artistic choices of a tattoo artist. He has tattooed around the globe and given many instructional seminars about the use of his color theory and technique.

See also
List of tattoo artists
LA Ink

References

External links
Official site
Nikko Hurato Biographical Feature on TattooDesigns.net

American tattoo artists
Participants in American reality television series
Living people
1981 births